Run to the Father is the second studio album by American Christian musician Cody Carnes. The album was released on March 13, 2020, via Capitol Christian Music Group. The deluxe edition of the album was released on February 5, 2021. Carnes collaborated with Hank Bentley, The Creak Music, Austin Davis, Jeremy Edwardson, Jeremy S.H. Griffith, David Leonard, Dan Mackenzie, Jacob Sooter, McKendree Tucker, and Colby Wedgeworth in the production of the album.

Run to the Father was supported by the release of four singles: "Nothing Else", "Heaven Fall", the title track, and "Christ Be Magnified". "Nothing Else" peaked at No. 31 on the US Hot Christian Songs chart. "Run to the Father" peaked at No. 23 on the Hot Christian Songs chart. "Christ Be Magnified" peaked at No. 45 on the Hot Christian Songs chart.

The album drew mixed reactions from the critics. The album debuted at No. 12 on the Billboard's Top Christian Albums Chart in the United States. Run to the Father was nominated for the Grammy Award for Best Contemporary Christian Music Album at the 2021 Grammy Awards.

Background
On March 2, 2020, Carnes that his second studio album, Run to the Father, was slated for release on March 13, 2020. The album marked his follow-up to his debut studio album, The Darker the Night / The Brighter the Morning (2017). The album also represents Carnes' return to his worship-leading roots. Carnes collaborated with venerated songwriters in worship music, such Matt Maher, Ran Jackson, Cory Asbury, Ethan Hulse, Steffany Gretzinger, Stefan Cashwill, and Passion's Kristian Stanfill and Brett Younker. Carnes shared the vision of the album, saying:

Release and promotion
On January 4, 2019, Cody Carnes released "Nothing Else" as a single. "Nothing Else" peaked at No. 31 on the US Hot Christian Songs chart.

Carnes released his second single of the year, "Heaven Fall", on March 8, 2019. 

On July 26, 2019, Carnes released "Run to the Father" as a single. "Run to the Father" peaked at No. 23 on the US Hot Christian Songs chart. 

Carnes released "Christ Be Magnified" as the fourth single from the album on January 1, 2020. "Christ Be Magnified" debuted at No. 45 on the US Hot Christian Songs chart.

Reception

Critical response

Run to the Father has garnered mixed reviews from critics of CCM and contemporary worship music genres.

Jonathan Andre in his 365 Days of Inspiring Media review praised Carnes' work on the album, for being "able to shape and reshape the view of how worship music should look like to not only people within the 4 walls of the church, but to those outside it as well. And for that I am grateful for his music." Mercedes Rich, indicating in a positive review of the album at Today's Christian Entertainment, said "This album has many other strong tracks, both lyrically and instrumentally. Carnes is not afraid to say the name of Jesus in his songs and remembers the strong importance of simplicity." Paul Delger gave a favourable review of the album for The Banner, saying "The album’s music is reflective, praiseworthy and comforting, while the sound offers an anthemic and pop feel. This record will not disappoint listeners searching for immersive, substantial praise music."

Jesus Freak Hideout's Chase Tremaine gave a negative review of the album, opined that "the songs oscillate between the laudable and the laughable," while berating Carnes' songwriting abilities. Timothy Yap of JubileeCast praised the album for being a welcome departure from the electronic sounds of his debut album, but also bemoaned that most tracks are "piano-based ballads" and Carnes' songwriting, saying "Carnes does have the potential to write excellent songs, but he's not experienced enough to write an entire album's worth of them."

Accolades

Commercial performance
In the United States, Run to the Father debuted at number twelve on the Billboard's Top Christian Albums Chart dated March 28, 2020.

Track listing

Personnel
Credits adapted from AllMusic.

 Hank Bentley — producer
 Jonathan Berlin — mastering engineer
 Bob Boyd — mastering engineer
 Jesse Brock — mixing assistant
 Cody Carnes — primary artist, producer
 The Creak Music — producer
 Austin Davis — producer
 Jeremy Edwardson — producer
 Sam Gibson — mixing
 Jeremy S.H. Griffith — mixing, producer
 Drew Lavyne — mastering engineer
 David Leonard — producer
 Dan Mackenzie — producer
 Sean Moffitt — mixing
 Jacob Sooter — producer
 Seth Talley — mixing
 McKendree Tucker — producer
 Colby Wedgeworth — producer

Charts

Weekly charts

Year-end charts

Release history

References

External links
 

2020 albums
Cody Carnes albums